Saint Cuthburh or Cuthburg, Cuthburga (died 31 August 725) was the first Abbess of Wimborne Minster. She was the sister of Ine, King of Wessex and was married to the Northumbrian king Aldfrith.

Life
Cuthburh was the daughter of Cenred of Wessex. In addition to her brother Ine, she also had a brother Ingild, who was an ancestor of Alfred the Great, and a sister Cwenburh.  Her marriage to Aldfrith allied him with Ine, one of the most powerful kings in Anglo-Saxon England. Cuthburh was Aldfrith's only known wife. Aldfrith had at least two sons, Osred and Offa, it is believed Cuthburh was the mother of Osred, Offa it is not certain. It is also believed they were the parents of a daughter Osana, who would later be known as Saint Osana.

According to a report by Florence of Worcester, written long afterwards, at some time before Aldfrith's death in 705 he and Cuthburh "renounced connubial intercourse for the love of God". Following this, Cuthburh entered Abbess Hildelith's nunnery at Barking Abbey. Cuthburh is traditionally associated with the "Cuthburh" mentioned in the dedication of Aldhelm's treatise De virginitate. It is thought that she was in some way related to Aldhelm. After Aldfrith's death, around 705, Cuthburh and Cwenburh established a double-monastery in her brother's kingdom of Wessex, at Wimborne, Dorset.

She is described as austere, and she communicated with prelates through a little hatch in the nunnery at Wimborne.  Among Saint Boniface's surviving letters is an anonymous account of a vision of Abbess Cuthburh in Hell.

Cuthburh died on 31 August 725 at Wimborne and is said to be buried under the wall of the chancel. 

In 1558, Wimborne Minster being in need of repair, the guardians of the church wrote Thomas Cromwell for permission to melt down the silver reliquary containing Cuthburh's head. As a few years later, the tower collapsed, it is surmised that the reliquary was confiscated to the King's use. It is not mentioned what then happened to her head.

The feast day associated with her is 31 August.

See also
House of Wessex family tree

References

Sources
 Farmer, D. H. (1987). The Oxford Dictionary of Saints, p. 96. Oxford: Clarendon Press.
 Lapidge, Michael, "Cuthburg", in M. Lapidge et al., The Blackwell Encyclopedia of Anglo-Saxon England. (Oxford: Blackwell, 1999)
 Mayo, C.H. (1860). History of Wimborne Minster: The Collegiate Church of Saint Cuthberga and King's Free Chapel at Wimborne, (pp. 4–6). London: Bell and Daldy. archive.org

External links
 

Year of birth unknown
725 deaths
7th-century English people
8th-century English nuns
7th-century Christian saints
West Saxon saints
Anglo-Saxon royal consorts
Burials at Wimborne Minster (church)
House of Wessex
English princesses
Date of death unknown
Place of birth unknown
Female saints of medieval England
7th-century English nuns
8th-century Christian saints
Medieval English saints